A.R. Monex Women's Pro Cycling Team is a professional women's cycling team registered in Italy, which first competed in elite road bicycle racing events such as the UCI Women's Road World Cup in 2015.

Team history
On 28 November 2014, Marzhan Baitlevova, Yekaterina Yuraitis, Makhabbat Umutzhanova, Natalya Sokovnina, and Aliya Kargaliyena signed with the team. On 30 November, Natalya Saitfutdinova and Faina Potapova signed with the team. On 2 December, the team signed Jessenia Meneses and Íngrid Drexel. On 6 December, the team signed Aizhan Zhaparova, Larisa Pankova, and Kseniya Dobrynina. On 12 December, Marika Campagnaro joined the team. On 18 December, Milda Jankauskaitė, Olena Demidova, and Carolina Rodriguez joined the team. On 24 December, Hanna Solovey signed for the team.

In June 2015, Astana-Acca Due O fired Hanna Solovey citing "unprofessional behaviour". This was disputed, with the Ukrainian Cycling Federation, claiming she was fired for refusing to take up Kazakhstani citizenship ahead of the Rio 2016 Olympics.

For the 2021 season, the team merged with the A.R. Efideporte mountain bike team.

Team roster

Major wins

2015
Copa Cuba de Pista – Points race, Íngrid Drexel
2016
Stage 1 Tour of Zhoushan Island I, Arianna Fidanza
2017
 Points classification Setmana Ciclista Valenciana, Arlenis Sierra
Stage 3, Arlenis Sierra
Mishmar Ha'Emeq Mountainbike (XCO), Tatyana Geneleva
Trofeo Alfredo Binda-Comune di Cittiglio, Arlenis Sierra
Rosh Ha'Ayin Mountainbike (XCO), Tatyana Geneleva
Orsago Chrono, Olena Pavlukhina
 Points classification Tour of California, Arlenis Sierra
 Youth classification, Arlenis Sierra
 Overall Vuelta Internacional Femenina a Costa Rica, Arlenis Sierra
 Points classification, Arlenis Sierra
 Mountains classification, Arlenis Sierra
Teams classification
Prologue, Stages 1 & 3, Arlenis Sierra
2018
 Overall Giro della Campania in Rosa, Elena Pirrone
Stage 2, Elena Pirrone
Stage 3, Martina Alzini
GP della Liberazione PINK, Letizia Paternoster
 Overall Festival Elsy Jacobs, Letizia Paternoster
 Points classification, Letizia Paternoster
 Mountains classification, Sofia Bertizzolo
 Youth classification, Letizia Paternoster
Stage 2, Letizia Paternoster
 Road Race, Pan American Cycling Championships, Arlenis Sierra
Stage 3 Tour of California, Arlenis Sierra
 Youth classification Giro Rosa, Sofia Bertizzolo
 Mountains classification Giro Toscana Int. Femminile – Memorial Michela Fanini, Sofia Bertizzolo
Central American and Caribbean Sports Games
Time Trial, Arlenis Sierra
Team Pursuit, Arlenis Sierra
Madison, Arlenis Sierra
Stage 2 Tour Cycliste Féminin International de l'Ardèche, Arlenis Sierra
 Overall Giro delle Marche, Sofia Bertizzolo
Mountains classification Vuelta a Colombia Femenina, Blanca Liliana Moreno
 Overall Vuelta Internacional Femenina a Costa Rica, Blanca Liliana Moreno
Stage 2 (ITT), Blanca Liliana Moreno
2019
Cadel Evans Great Ocean Road Race, Arlenis Sierra
 Mountains classification Tour of California, Blanca Liliana Moreno
Chabany Race, Olga Shekel
 Overall Vuelta Femenina a Guatemala, Liliana Moreno
Stages 1, 2, 4 & 5, Arlenis Sierra
Stage 3, Carolina Rodriguez
 Overall Giro Toscana Int. Femminile – Memorial Michela Fanini, Arlenis Sierra
 Points classification, Arlenis Sierra
Prologue, Arlenis Sierra
2020
Stage 1 Women's Herald Sun Tour, Arlenis Sierra
2021
Clasica Femenina Navarra, Arlenis Sierra
 Overall Giro della Toscana Int. Femminile – Memorial Michela Fanini, Arlenis Sierra
 Points classification, Arlenis Sierra
Stages 1 & 2, Arlenis Sierra
Tre Valli Varesine Women's Race, Arlenis Sierra

National champions

2015
 Kazakhstan Road Race, Natalya Saifutdinova
 Kazakhstan Time Trial, Yekaterina Yuraitis
 Mexico Time Trial, Íngrid Drexel
2016
 Kazakhstan Road Race, Natalya Saifutdinova
 Kazakhstan Time Trial, Yekaterina Yuraitis
 Russia Time Trial, Tatiana Antoshina
 Kazakhstan Track (Scratch Race), Nadezhda Geneleva
 Kazakhstan Track (Points Race), Makhabbat Umutzhanova
2017
 Cuba Road Race, Arlenis Sierra
 Cuba Time Trial, Arlenis Sierra
 Kazakhstan Road Race, Tatyana Geneleva
 Azerbaijan Road Race, Olena Pavlukhina
 Azerbaijan Time Trial, Olena Pavlukhina
 Kazakhstan Track (Points race), Zhanerke Sanakbayeva
 Kazakhstan Track (Scratch race), Zhanerke Sanakbayeva
 Kazakhstan Track (Individual pursuit), Amiliya Iskakova
2018
 Pan American Road Race, Arlenis Sierra
 Kazakhstan Road Race, Natalya Saifutdinova
 Kazakhstan Time Trial, Natalya Saifutdinova
 European Track (Elimination race), Letizia Paternoster
 European U23 Track (Team pursuit), Martina Alzini
 European U23 Track (Team pursuit), Letizia Paternoster
 European U23 Track (Omnium), Letizia Paternoster
2019
 Kazakhstan Time Trial, Makhabbat Umutzhanova
 Kazakhstan Road Race, Svetlana Pachshenko
 Cuba Road Race, Arlenis Sierra
 Cuba Time Trial, Arlenis Sierra
2020
 Ukraine Time Trial, Olga Shekel
 Mexico Track (Elimination race), Lizbeth Salazar
 Mexico Track (Omnium), Lizbeth Salazar
 Mexico Track (Points race), Lizbeth Salazar
2021
 Mexico Road Race, Lizbeth Salazar
 Russia Track (Team Pursuit), Mariia Miliaeva
 Russia Track (Team Pursuit), Maria Novolodskaya
 Russia Track (Madison), Maria Novolodskaya

References

External links

UCI Women's Teams
Cycling teams established in 2015
Cycling teams based in Kazakhstan
Cycling teams based in Italy